Brent Morin (born August 31, 1986) is an American stand-up comedian, actor, musician and writer. He was a panelist in the sixth season of Chelsea Lately and played Justin Kearney on the NBC sitcom Undateable and the agent Hobbs on the sci-fi  web-series Crunch Time, on Rooster Teeth. In 2015, Morin released his stand-up comedy show, I'm Brent Morin, exclusively on Netflix.

Early life 
Morin was born in South Windsor, Connecticut, to two inner city high school English teacher parents. Morin has an older brother, who was a concert pianist, and a younger brother, who is a doctor. He graduated from South Windsor High School. He is of Irish and Italian background.

Career 

Morin moved to Los Angeles at 18 to study at a film school at Columbia College Hollywood. Although he graduated with a film degree, Morin started doing stand-up and eventually decided that was what he wanted to do. Morin has said that he was inspired by his idols, Albert Brooks and Woody Allen. After graduation, he worked as a production assistant with Conan O'Brien on The Tonight Show with Conan O'Brien on NBC and continued with Conan on TBS. He went from being a general office production assistant to becoming the set production assistant/Andy Richter's stand-in. Morin has appeared regularly as a stand-up comic on shows with The Comedy Store, The Improv and Laugh Factory, as well as on tours throughout the United States. In his network TV debut, Morin co-starred in the Bill Lawrence NBC series Undateable, a multi-camera sitcom with a live audience, which was based on the book Undateable: 311 Things Guys Do That Guarantee They Won't Be Dating or Having Sex by Ellen Rakieten and Anne Coyle.

Morin portrayed Justin Kearney, the owner of Black Eyes Bar and hopeless romantic roommate of Danny (played by Chris D'Elia). Undateable was unique in that it was a cast full of stand-up comedians who were good friends before the show aired. The show often incorporates improv, with Morin playing Felix to D'Elia's grouch Oscar à la The Odd Couple. Lawrence and the cast (Chris D'Elia, Morin, Ron Funches, and Rick Glassman) went on a series of stand-up tour dates, with an appearance on @midnight to promote the show. In 2016, Morin was cast for the Rooster Teeth web series, Crunch Time. In 2018, he appeared on the second season of Netflix's The Standups, performing a half-hour special.

Personal life
Morin previously dated actress Angie Simms, confirming their relationship in 2016, and breakup in 2017.

Filmography

Stage

References

External links 

 
 

1986 births
Living people
People from South Windsor, Connecticut
American male television actors
21st-century American comedians
21st-century American male actors
Male actors from Connecticut
Comedians from Connecticut